Du Canal station is a commuter rail station operated by Exo in the borough of Lachine in Montreal, Quebec, Canada. It is served by  the Candiac line.

The station was opened as part of the strategy to reduce traffic congestion during the Turcot Interchange reconstruction.

Bus connections

Société de transport de Montréal (STM)

References

External links
 Du Canal Commuter Train Station Information (RTM)
 Du Canal Commuter Train Station Schedule (RTM)
 2016 STM System Map

Exo commuter rail stations
Lachine, Quebec